Agathymus baueri, or Bauer's giant-skipper, is a species of giant skipper in the family Hesperiidae. It is found in North America.

The MONA or Hodges number for Agathymus baueri is 4133.

Subspecies
 Agathymus baueri baueri (D. Stallings and Turner, 1954)
 Agathymus baueri freemani D. Stallings and Turner, 1960

References

 Hodges, Ronald W., et al., eds. (1983). Check List of the Lepidoptera of America North of Mexico, xxiv + 284.
 Opler, Paul A. (1999). A Field Guide to Western Butterflies, Second Edition, xiv + 540.
 Pelham, Jonathan P. (2008). "A catalogue of the butterflies of the United States and Canada, with a complete bibliography of the descriptive and systematic literature". Journal of Research on the Lepidoptera, vol. 40, xiv + 658.

Further reading

 Arnett, Ross H. (2000). American Insects: A Handbook of the Insects of America North of Mexico. CRC Press.

Megathyminae
Butterflies described in 1954